The 2020–21 Mississippi Valley State Delta Devils basketball team represented Mississippi Valley State University during the 2020–21 NCAA Division I men's basketball season. The team was led by second-year head coach Lindsey Hunter, and played their home games at Harrison HPER Complex in Itta Bena, Mississippi as a member of the Southwestern Athletic Conference. In March, they were the worst ranked team in NCAA Division I according to Kenpom, with the least efficient offense and defense.

Roster

Schedule and results

|-
!colspan=12 style=|Non-conference regular season

|-
!colspan=12 style=|SWAC regular season

|-
!colspan=9 style=|SWAC tournament

References

Mississippi Valley State Delta Devils basketball seasons
Mississippi Valley State Delta Devils
Mississippi Valley State Delta Devils basketball
Mississippi Valley State Delta Devils basketball